Milimani West is a settlement in Kenya's Lamu County.

References 

Populated places in North Eastern Province (Kenya)
Lamu County